Bielenstein is a surname. Notable people with the surname include:

Bernhard Bielenstein (1877–1959), Baltic German architect
Hans Bielenstein (1920–2015), Swedish sinologist and professor